Community learning may refer to:

Adult education
Learning community